Sardar Bahadur Khan Women's University is a women's university in Quetta, Balochistan, Pakistan. It was established in 2004.

The university offers degree programs in Arts and Sciences. It is named for the former agent to the Governor General and Chief Commissioner of Balochistan, Sardar Bahadur Khan.

History
It was inaugurated on March 18, 2004 and Masters programs were started by May 2004. The Bachelor of Science program for sciences was started in 2005. The first convocation was held in the middle of 2006.

Convocation speech

Women education occupies great significance for the development of our society, because women are 51 percent of our population; they cannot be ignored in the development of the country.

This was stated by Balochistan Governor Nawab Zulfiqar Ali Magsi while addressing 5th convocation of Sardar Bahadur Khan Women's University. He said he was personally supportive of women's education.

Bomb attack
As part of the June 2013 Quetta attacks carried out by Lashkar-e-Jhangvi, a bus carrying students from the university was attacked with an explosive device. The resulting explosion killed 14 women and injured 19 others.

It is believed that the intended targets of the bus bombing were Shia from the Hazara ethnic minority, who have been the targets of previous sectarian attacks in Balochistan. However, due to an earlier change of route, the bus carried a more ethnically mixed group and has been described as "the wrong target" of the perpetrators.

Academics
Faculty of Life Sciences
Faculty of Basic Sciences
Faculty of Social Sciences
Faculty of Management & Computer Sciences

References

External links
 

Universities and colleges in Quetta District
Women's universities and colleges in Pakistan
Educational institutions established in 2004
Public universities and colleges in Balochistan, Pakistan
2004 establishments in Pakistan